The following highways are numbered 858:

United States